The Volksmarine (VM,) was the naval force of the German Democratic Republic (GDR) from 1956 to 1990. The Volksmarine was one of the service branches of the National People's Army and primarily performed a coastal defence role along the GDR's Baltic Sea coastline and territorial waters.

History

Soon after the end of World War II and the beginning of the Cold War, the Soviet Union initiated the rearming of the German Democratic Republic (GDR), which had been founded in October 1949 as a satellite state from the Soviet Zone of Occupation.  Beginning in 1950, Soviet Navy officers helped to establish the Hauptverwaltung Seepolizei (Main Administration Sea Police), which was renamed Volkspolizei–See (VP–See) (People's Police – Sea) on 1 July 1952. At the same time parts of the erstwhile maritime police were reorganized into the new Grenzpolizei–See (Border Police –– Sea), to guard the sea frontiers, and incorporated into the Deutsche Grenzpolizei (German Border Police) that had been set up in 1946. By 1952 the VP–See is estimated to have numbered some 8,000 personnel.

On 1 March 1956, the GDR formally created its armed forces, the National People's Army (Nationale Volksarmee, NVA), and the VP–See became the Verwaltung Seestreitkräfte der NVA (Maritime Forces Administration of the NVA) with about 10,000 men. In November 1960, these maritime forces of the National People's Army were officially designated Volksmarine (People's Navy).  Over the next years the navy gradually received a number of new ships, mostly built in the GDR.  Only the coastal protection ships and some of the fast torpedo boats were provided by the Soviet Union, as were all helicopters, and some auxiliary craft were purchased from Poland.

Following the erection of the Berlin Wall on 13 August 1961, the Grenzbrigade Küste der Grenzpolizei (GBK) (Coastal Border Brigade of the Border Police) was incorporated into the Volksmarine.  With the reorganization of 1965 all attack forces, i.e., the fast torpedo boats, were combined into a single flotilla (the 6th Flotilla) and stationed on the Bug peninsula of the island of Rügen. In the 1970s, the Volksmarine had grown to about 18,000 men. In the 1980s some of the ships were replaced and the Volksmarine acquired Soviet-built fighter-bombers. During 19851989, the Volksmarine caused about 180 reported incidents due to a maritime border dispute with Poland in the Pomeranian bay; in subsequent negotiations about two thirds of the disputed maritime area were allocated to the GDR.

The Volksmarine was dissolved, like all other branches of the former National People's Army, on 2 October 1990 – the day before the official reunification of Germany.  Some of its staff was absorbed into the Bundesmarine (which was henceforth called the Deutsche Marine), some by the German Border Police.  Most of the ships and other equipment were scrapped or sold; about one third of the ships went to the Indonesian Navy. Few if any former Volksmarine vessels remain in service with the modern-day German Navy. The last commander of the Volksmarine, Vizeadmiral Hendrik Born, wrote a multi-paragraph commentary for Dieter Flohr and Peter Seemann's 2009 book, Die Volksmarine, a comprehensive and picture-oriented history of the Volksmarine.

Operative tasks
The Volksmarine was first and foremost a coastal defence force, but offensive action and amphibious assaults against NATO were also included in its training and plans. It was operationally incorporated into the United Baltic Sea Fleets of the Warsaw Pact states, intended to serve alongside them in the event of war. Its designated area of operations was the Baltic Sea and the entrances to the Baltic Sea. If open warfare had erupted between the Warsaw Pact and NATO, the primary mission of the Volksmarine was to keep the sea lanes open for Soviet reinforcements and to participate in offensive actions against the coasts of hostile nations in the Baltic Sea.  For these purposes, it was equipped with light forces such as anti-submarine ships, fast torpedo boats, minesweepers as well as landing craft. Routine duty was heavily focused on extensive reconnaissance activities, carried out mainly by the minesweepers and specialized electronic surveillance boats.

The 6th Border Brigade (Coast) had a special responsibility for the prevention of "Republikflucht" (people leaving the GDR without official permission).  With effect from 1 November 1961, it was subordinated to the Volksmarine.  It had a substantial number of small patrol boats and surveillance posts along the coast.

Commanders
Konteradmiral Felix Scheffler (1 March 1956 – 31 December 1956)
Vizeadmiral Waldemar Verner (1 January 1957 – 31 July 1959)
Konteradmiral Wilhelm Ehm (1 August 1959 – 31 July 1961, 25 February 1963 – 30 November 1987)
Konteradmiral Heinz Neukirchen (1 August 1961 – 24 February 1963)
Vizeadmiral Theodor Hoffmann (1 December 1987 – 17 November 1989)
Vizeadmiral Hendrik Born (11 December 1989 – 2 October 1990)

Organization

The Volksmarine was headed by the Kommando der Volksmarine (People's Navy HQ Command) in Rostock-Gehlsdorf.  It was structured as follows (in 1985):
1st Flotilla in Peenemünde,
4th Flotilla in Rostock-Warnemünde,
6th Flotilla at Bug on Rügen Island,
6th Border Brigade (Coast) in Rostock.

Shore-based forces consisted of:
one Torpedo Technical Support Company (TTK-18) in Sassnitz (servicing anti-submarine torpedoes)
one Naval Helicopter Wing (MHG-18) in Parow near Stralsund
one Naval Flight Wing (MFG-28) in Laage
one Navy Engineering Battalion (MPiB-18) in Sassnitz
one Combat Swimmer Command (KSK-18) in Kühlungsborn
one Coastal Missile Regiment (Ground Support) (KRR-18) in Schwarzenpfost
one Coastal Defense Regiment (Ground Support) (KVR-18) in Rostock (from 1988)
one Naval Propaganda Company (PRK-18) in Rostock-Warnemünde
the Maritime Hydrographic Service of the GDR (SHD) in Rostock
testing and other special facilities

Training facilities
Naval Officers Academy "Karl Liebknecht" in Stralsund (training of naval officers)
Naval NCO Academy  "Walter Steffens" in Parow (naval training of NCOs and seamen)
NCO School for Support Services at Dänholm near Stralsund (technical training of NCOs)

Equipment

The Volksmarine was equipped with:
 Landing craft
 Minelayers and minesweepers
 Fast torpedo and missile boat (like Project 131 "Libelle")
 Coastal defense ships
 Submarine hunters
 Three Koni-class frigates (Rostock (141), Berlin- Haupstadt der DDR (142), and Halle (143))- Purchased from the Soviet Navy in the 1980s
 Intelligence ships
 Training ships
 Support craft
 Three squadrons of combat helicopters: Mil Mi-4MÄ Hound Mil Mi-8 Hip, Mi-14PL Haze-A and Mil Mi-14BT Haze-B
 Fighter-bombers: Sukhoi Su-22M4 Fitter-K

Music
The People's Navy's band played a number of specially-composed musical pieces. Most notable is the "Präsentiermarsch der Volksmarine", which was composed by Ludwig Schmidt for use at ceremonial events. "Unsere Volksmarine" was also written for use at parades, while "Matrosen von Kronstadt" was an East German adaptation of the 1926 Soviet Navy song "Forward, Red Marines". The instrumental pieces written for the Volksmarine fell out of use after the reunification of Germany, and are not used by the modern German Navy.

Volksmarine admirals

There were 37 admirals in the history of the Volksmarine and its predecessor organizations.  They were:

Flottenadmiral

No one was awarded this rank.

Admiral
Waldemar Verner
Wilhelm Ehm
Theodor Hoffmann

Vizeadmiral

Konteradmiral
Felix Scheffler
Richard Fischer
John Streubel
Rudi Wegner
Heinz Irmscher
Lothar Heinecke
Heinrich Jordt
Walter Kühn
Werner Henninger
Klaus Kahnt
Hans-Joachim Dönitz
Joachim Münch
Wolfgang Laue
Hans Heß
Werner Kotte
Rolf Rödel
Herbert Städtke
Günther Pöschel
Helmut Milzow
Friedrich Elchlepp
Eberhard Grießbach
Egon Nitz
Dr. Karl Weiß
Hans Partzsch
Herbert Bernig
Gerhard Müller
Peter Miethe

See also
Baltic Fleet
National People's Army
Orders, decorations, and medals of East Germany

Notes

References

 Douglas Peifer (2002), The Three German Navies; Dissolution, Transition, and New Beginnings, 1945-1960, University of Florida Press, ISBN 0-8130-2552-2 
 Douglas Peifer (1998),· “Staffing and Training the East German Navy during its Founding Years: Party Loyalists, Kriegsmarine Veterans, and Communist Youth Activists.” In New Interpretations in Naval History: Selected Papers from the Thirteenth Naval History Symposium, ed. William McBride. Annapolis MD:  Naval Institute Press. ISBN 1-5575-0648-5.

Siegfried Breyer, Peter Joachim Lapp: Die Volksmarine der DDR, Bernard & Graefe Verlag, 
Robert Rosentreter: Im Seegang der Zeit, Vier Jahrzehnte Volksmarine, Ingo Koch Verlag, 
Klaus Froh, Rüdiger Wenzke: Die Generale und Admirale der NVA. Ein biographisches Handbuch. 4. Auflage. Ch. Links, Berlin 2000,

External links
 Marinekameradschaft KSS e.V. site - Includes information on 1st & 4th Flotillas (in German)

 
Naval history of Germany
Disbanded navies
Military units and formations established in 1956
1990 disestablishments in Germany